The University of Maryland School of Dentistry (abbreviated UMSOD), is the dental school of the University System of Maryland. It was founded as an independent institution, the Baltimore College of Dental Surgery, in 1840 and was the birthplace of the Doctor of Dental Surgery (D.D.S.) degree. It is known as the first dental college in the world. It is headquartered at the University of Maryland, Baltimore campus. It is the only dental school in Maryland.

History 
 Related history: Harvard School of Dental Medicine > History
The Baltimore College of Dental Surgery (BCDS) was chartered by an act of the General Assembly of Maryland (state legislature) in 1840. Its co-founders, Doctors Horace H. Hayden and Chapin A. Harris have been both inducted in the Pierre Fauchard Academy Hall of Fame. Dr. Harris was the school's first dean and a professor of practical dentistry. Following the death of Dr. Hayden on January 25, 1844, he became the school's second president. The College is still in existence today and is part of the University of Maryland, Baltimore as one of its five professional graduate level schools.

The establishment of the Baltimore College of Dental Surgery is seen as one of the three crucial steps in the foundation of the dental profession in the United States and the world.

Today, the University of Maryland School of Dentistry enjoys one of the most advanced dental education facilities in the world.  The new 12-story building on West Fayette Street on the westside of downtown Baltimore was completed in October 2006. The structure replaced a previous building on the site that was only three decades old. The total cost for the new establishment amounted to over $140 million dollars, the highest amount ever spent on an academic building by the State of Maryland.

Alumni

 Harry Estes Kelsey
 George Edward Post, Class of 1863
 John Mankey Riggs, Class of 1854
 Adalbert J. Volck, Class of 1852
 Jordan Belfort, Dropped out on first day
 William T.G. Morton, Class of 1842

References

External links
University of Maryland School of Dentistry
University System of Maryland
Yearbooks from 1901-1989

School of Dentistry
Dental schools in Maryland
Dentistry School
Educational institutions established in 1840
1840 establishments in Maryland